Qurtoba is the name of:

 Córdoba, Spain
 Qurtoba District, one of A'asema city districts in Kuwait
Qurtoba International School, a school in Jordan

See also 
Al Andalus